Riverdale is a neighborhood of Dayton, Ohio, United States. It is situated northwest of Dayton across the Great Miami River.

References

External links
History of Riverdale

Neighborhoods in Dayton, Ohio